The 2009 European Parliament election in Czech Republic was the election of the delegation from Czech Republic to the European Parliament in 2009. The Civic Democratic Party has won the election with a surprisingly strong lead against the Czech Social Democratic Party. Communist Party of Bohemia and Moravia came third and the Christian and Democratic Union – Czechoslovak People's Party became the last party to enter the Parliament.

Two newly founded right-wing parties, the Czech wing Libertas.cz of Declan Ganley's Libertas founded by Vladimír Železný and the Party of Free Citizens, ran in the election.

Background
Previous election was held in 2004. It was won by the Civic Democratic Party that won 30% of votes ahead of the Communist Party of Bohemia and Moravia which received 20% of the votes. Czech Social Democratic Party of Prime Minister Vladimír Špidla was heavily defeated receiving only 9% of votes finishing fourth. Špidle resigned after the election.

Civic Democrats joined European People's Party group after the election as a member of European Democrats. ODS the cooperated with British Conservative Party to establish new Eurosceptic faction within European Parliament.

2004 Seats

Procedure
The 22 of Czech delegation in the European parliament are elected using open list proportional representation, in which they can give preferential votes for up to two candidates on their chosen list. Seats are allocated using the d'Hondt method, with an electoral threshold of 5% nationwide for single parties. Candidates who receive preferential votes from more than 5% of voters are moved to the top of their list, and in cases where more than one candidate receives over 5% of the preferential votes, they are ranked in order of votes received.

Campaign

Civic Democratic Party
First candidates were introduced on 9 February 2009. Jan Zahradil became electoral leader. Other candidates included Evžen Tošenovský, Oldřich Vlasák etg. Party also launched its election website on the same day. Zahradil stated that ODS will be forced to use negative campaign as reaction to strateg of its opponents. Remaining candidates were introduced on 16 March 2009.

Campaign of Civic Democratic Party (ODS) was launched by electoral leader Jan Zahradil on 13 February 2009. ODS stated that it would invest 40 million CZK to the campaign.

ODS started negative campaign against ČSSD as response to Social Democratic campaigns from previous years. Civic Democrats founded Blue Team to help the party with campaign.

The Civic Democratic Party was active on internet and used social media during its campaign while its main rival and election front-runner Social Democratic Party underestimated internet campaign and Civic Democrats got to lead as a result.

Czech Social Democratic Party
ČSSD planned to invest 30 million CZK. Czech Social Democratic Party was led by Jiří Havel. Party decided to focus on Financial crisis and domestic issues during its campaign. Social Democratic Party was considered front-runner as it was leading in polls but the lead narrowed as the election date was getting closer. The Civic Democratic Party was active on internet and used social media during its campaign and eventually. Social Democrats on the other hand underestimated internet campaign and Civic Democrats got to lead as a result.

Communist Party of Bohemia and Moravia
Miloslav Ransdorf was announced as electoral leader on 18 September 2008.

Christian and Democratic Union – People's Party
Christian Democrats launched election campaign on 9 March 2009. They introduced their candidates on 20 March 2009.

Green Party
Greens voted Jan Dusík as its electoral leader on 28 February 2009.

EP list leaders 
ODS – Jan Zahradil
ČSSD – Jiří Havel
KSČM – Miloslav Ransdorf
KDU-ČSL – Zuzana Roithová
SZ – Jan Dusík
SNK-ED – Lukáš Macek

Campaign Finances

Debates

Opinion polls

Media survey

Results 
The Civic Democratic Party (ODS) has won the election with 30% and 9 seats. Party's chairman Mirek Topolánek stated that the election showed that ODS is once again an equal rival to Social Democrats. Czech Social Democratic Party finished second with 22% of votes and 6 seats. Party was dissatisfied with the result as it expected a better result. Chairman Jiří Paroubek stated that party was damaged by low turnout but noted that it is improvement as the party received only 8.8% in 2004 election. Communist Party of Bohemia and Moravia considered the result as an improvement from 2006 parliamentary election. KDU-ČSL was pleased with the result as the party showed stable support. Other parties failed to reach 5% threshold. Green Party received only 2% of votes. Chairman Martin Bursík decided to resign as a result. Czech Sovereignty led by MEP Jana Bobošíková received 4% and narrowly failed to win any seats.

European groups

Elected MEPs

References

External links
List of candidates in the European Parliament election, 2009 (Czech Republic)
Opinion polls immediately before election

Czech Republic
European Parliament elections in the Czech Republic
2009 elections in the Czech Republic